Roger Federer defeated Marin Čilić in the final, 6–3, 6–1, 6–4, to win the gentlemen's singles title at the 2017 Wimbledon Championships. It was his record eighth Wimbledon men's singles title (surpassing Pete Sampras and William Renshaw) and 19th major title overall. Federer also became the second man in the Open Era, after Björn Borg in 1976, to win Wimbledon without losing a set. This was Federer's 70th appearance at a major, tying the record for male players, and a record-breaking 11th men's singles final at the same major tournament. In addition, with his third-round win over Mischa Zverev, Federer won his 317th Grand Slam singles match, surpassing Serena Williams' record. With his first-round win, Federer surpassed Jimmy Connors' record for most match wins at Wimbledon. In the same match, he hit his 10,000th ace, becoming only the third man to do so. The tournament marked the fifth time that Rafael Nadal and Federer won the French Open and Wimbledon, respectively, in the same year.	

Andy Murray was the defending champion and top seed but was defeated by Sam Querrey in the quarterfinals - the second consecutive year in which Querrey beat the No. 1 seed at Wimbledon, after beating Novak Djokovic in the third round the previous year. Murray nonetheless retained the ATP No. 1 singles ranking, as Rafael Nadal, Stan Wawrinka, and Novak Djokovic failed to gain enough ranking points to surpass him.

This was also the first major since the 2009 French Open in which Murray, Nadal and Djokovic all failed to reach the semifinals, and the first time since 2004 that no player reached all four quarterfinals in a year. With his win over Murray, Querrey became the first American man to reach a Grand Slam semifinal since Andy Roddick at the 2009 Wimbledon Championships; it was also his second win over a world No. 1 player, the first being against Djokovic at the 2016 Wimbledon Championships.

For the first time since the 2005 Australian Open, David Ferrer was not seeded at a Grand Slam, and it was the first time since the 2004 US Open that Guillermo García López did not play at a Grand Slam, ending his streak of 50 consecutive Grand Slam appearances.

Wawrinka was attempting to complete the career Grand Slam but lost to Daniil Medvedev in the first round.

This was also the last Grand Slam tournament for former world No. 2 Tommy Haas.

Seeds
All seedings per modified ATP rankings.

Draw

Finals

Top half

Section 1

Section 2

Section 3

Section 4

Bottom half

Section 5

Section 6

Section 7

Section 8

Seeded players
Seeds are adjusted on a surface-based system to reflect more accurately the individual player's grass court achievement as per the following formula, which applies to the top 32 players according to the ATP rankings on 26 June 2017:
 Take Entry System Position points at 26 June 2017.
 Add 100% points earned for all grass court tournaments in the past 12 months (20 June 2016 – 25 June 2017).
 Add 75% points earned for best grass court tournament in the 12 months before that (22 June 2015 – 19 June 2016).

Rank and points before are as of 3 July 2017. Because the 2017 tournament took place one week later than in 2016, points defending includes results from both the 2016 Wimbledon Championships and the tournaments from the week of 11 July 2016 (Hamburg, Newport and Båstad).

Withdrawals
The following players would have been seeded, but withdrew from the event.

Other entry information

Wild cards

Protected ranking

Qualifiers
The qualifying competitions take place in Bank of England Sports Centre, Roehampton started from 26 June 2017 and to be scheduled to end on 29 June 2017. However, due to heavy rain on the second day, it has now extended to 30 June 2017.

Lucky loser
  Alexander Bublik

Withdrawals

Retirements

Notes

References

External links
 Men's Singles Draw
 2017 Wimbledon Championships – Men's draws and results at the International Tennis Federation

Men's Singles